Engelsbach is a river of Rhineland-Palatinate, Germany. It springs at the eastern outskirts of Rengsdorf. It flows southward through the valley Engelsbachtal. Near the reservoir Schwanenteich at the suburban administrative district  of Neuwied, it discharges into the Aubach from the right.

The route through the valley of the Engelsbach is part of the Rheinsteig hiking trail.

See also
List of rivers of Rhineland-Palatinate

References

External links
 report of a hiking tour, with photos: 

Rivers of Rhineland-Palatinate
Rivers of the Westerwald
Rivers of Germany